Breust is a former village in the Dutch province of Limburg. It is located in the municipality of Eijsden-Margraten, and is now a neighbourhood of Eijsden.

Breust was a separate municipality until 1828, when the area was divided between the municipalities of Eijsden and Sint Geertruid.

References

Former municipalities of Limburg (Netherlands)
Eijsden-Margraten